John Wilton (Penguin, Tasmania, 31 January 1925 – 13 October 2002) was the member for Broadmeadows in the Victorian Legislative Assembly from 1962 to 1985.  He was a member of the Labor Party.

References

Members of the Victorian Legislative Assembly
Australian Labor Party members of the Parliament of Victoria
1925 births
2002 deaths
People from Tasmania
20th-century Australian politicians
People from Penguin, Tasmania